The 2023 Canadian Championship will be the sixteenth edition of the Canadian Championship, the premier men's domestic cup competition in Canadian soccer, and the 22nd competition staged to determine the winner of the Voyageurs Cup. It will be run as a knockout tournament with all eleven professional men's soccer teams in Canada, from Major League Soccer and the Canadian Premier League, competing, along with the champions of the three semi-professional League1 Canada competitions. The tournament will mark the first Voyageurs Cup campaign for FC Laval, TSS FC Rovers and Vancouver FC, and will determine a place in the 2024 CONCACAF Champions League.

Format 
The winner of the 2022 Canadian Championship, Vancouver Whitecaps FC, and runner-up Toronto FC, will both receive byes to the second round. The remaining 12 teams will begin the competition from the first round in April. Qualification to the Canadian Championship for 2023 will be automatic for Canadian teams within Major League Soccer and for all teams within the Canadian Premier League, Canada's tier-one national league. The 2022 champions from the three regional pro-am leagues of League1 Canada (League1 Ontario, PLSQ, and League1 British Columbia) also qualified.

The 2023 Canadian Championship will determine a place in the continental 2024 CONCACAF Champions League tournament. If the winner has already qualified for the Champions League via berths in the 2023 Major League Soccer, 2023 Leagues Cup or 2023 Canadian Premier League, the place will go to the runners-up in the final, and then to the "higher-ranked" semi-finalist based on as-of-yet unspecified criteria, if the runners-up have also already qualified.

Teams

Tournament

Rules 
Ties in the 2023 tournament will be played as a single 90-minute match with additional time. If a match ends in a draw, no extra time will be played, and the match will go straight to a kicks from the penalty mark to decide the winner. Each team competing in the tournament may select up to 30 players to their tournament roster. If a player already nominated to a team's tournament roster is transferred to a competing team during the tournament, they are disqualified from further play in the tournament. For each match, teams can select up to 18 players for a match roster, while their starting lineup must include at least 3 Canadian players. Both teams can make up to 5 substitutions and 2 concussion substitutions throughout the match at up to 3 stoppages of play, excluding half-time.

Draw 
On January 17, 2023, Canada Soccer announced that the draw for the championship would be held on January 31 at 8:00 pm ET. The draw details and pots were announced on January 24. Prior to the commencement of the draw, one club from Pot B1 was moved into Pot A1, then one club from Pot B2 was moved to B1, and then both clubs from Pot C were moved to Pot B2, resulting in an even distribution of three teams in each of the first round pots. Atlético Ottawa and the HFX Wanderers were placed in Pot B2 prior to the draw as the eastern teams that did not commit to hosting a match in the first round. The Wanderers were eventually drawn from Pot A1 as the designated home team for their first round match against Ottawa, and Canada Soccer will determine a neutral venue for the match.

Bracket

First round

Summary 

|}

Matches

Quarter-finals

Summary 

|}

Matches

Semi-finals

Summary 

|}

Matches

Final

References 
Notes

Citations

External links 
 Canadian Championship at Canada Soccer

2023 domestic association football cups
2023 in Canadian soccer
2023 North American domestic association football cups
2023 Canadian Championship